Justin Taylor Hodges (born July 6, 1977) is an American country music singer and actor.  In 2011, he signed to Show Dog-Universal Music and released one album, which has produced three charting singles on the Hot Country Songs chart.

Early life
Justin Taylor Hodges was born on July 6, 1977, and raised in Fort Worth, Texas, by father James McKinley Hodges and mother Marsha Kathleen McDade Hodges. He attended The Oakridge School for high school and graduated in 1996. He later graduated from Texas Christian University and moved to Los Angeles, spending several years on the coffeehouse circuit. He met his wife in Jay, California and they moved to Nashville in 2009.

Musical career
Hodges' parents are both involved in music: his father is a pianist who owns a recording studio in Fort Worth, Texas, and his mother was briefly signed to MCA Nashville in the 1980s. She recorded a version of "The Bed You Made for Me", later a top 5 hit for Highway 101 in 1987.

In mid-2011, Hodges signed to Show Dog-Universal Music and released his debut single, "Hunt You Down", which he co-wrote with Rivers Rutherford and Mark Collie. Billy Dukes of Taste of Country gave the song four stars out of five, saying that it had an "infectious melody" but criticizing the lyrics for being "too cool for the room". Kyle Ward gave an identical rating at Roughstock, also saying that the song had an original sound, although he thought that the "story is a bit implausible" and said that he did not understand the song's bridge. Hodges' debut album includes eleven songs, nine of which he co-wrote. "Goodbyes Made You Mine" and "Sleepy Little Town" also charted from it.

Hodges joined Toby Keith's 2011 Locked and Loaded Tour.

In 2015, Hodges released an EP, titled Locks on Doors.  The EP sold 500 copies in its debut week.

Discography

Studio albums

Extended plays

Singles

Music videos

Filmography

 Finding Christmas 2013 
 Verizon Super Bowl Central Kickoff Concert 
 The Dust Storm 
 Christmas Stars 2019

References

External links

American country singer-songwriters
American male singer-songwriters
Living people
People from Fort Worth, Texas
Show Dog-Universal Music artists
1977 births
Singer-songwriters from Texas
21st-century American singers
21st-century American male singers